Yeh Hai Mumbai Meri Jaan is a 1999 Indian Hindi-language film directed by Mahesh Bhatt and produced by Mukesh Bhatt, starring Saif Ali Khan, Twinkle Khanna, Akshay Anand and Chunky Pandey. The film was flop at the box office.

Plot

Yeh Hai Mumbai Meri Jaan is a love story between Saif Ali Khan and Twinkle Khanna while Akshay Anand is the spoiler.

The film is a remake of Michael J. Fox's 1987 movie The Secret of My Success. Saif plays Raju Tarachand a small-town guy who has come to Mumbai to try his luck in the corporate world. On his arrival he gets duped of his car and luggage by Chali (Chunky Pandey). He goes to Mr. Malhotra's office and convinces him to grant him a job. When he finds out that he has been hired as a lowly peon, he quits thinking this is beneath him. He changes his mind when he sees that the beautiful Jasmine (Twinkle Khanna) also works there, in hope of catching her eye.

Mr. Malhotra is having problems in his company that, unknown to anyone, are caused by his brother Papaji (Avtar Gill). He has placed a spy, M.R. Poplet (Girish Dhamija), to sabotage the company so that he (Papaji) can take it over. Malhotra hires a corporate P.I., David Rathod, to help him, but Rathod gets held up. Raju grabs this opportunity to get close to Jasmine and apply his training to set the company right while trying to maintain his job as the peon.

How this convoluted thing gets resolved is the story of the movie.

Cast
 Saif Ali Khan ... Raju Tarachand / Husna Bano / David Rathod
 Twinkle Khanna ... Jasmin Arora
 Chunky Pandey ... Chali D'Souza
 Saurabh Shukla ... Mr. Malhotra "Chhotey"
 Akshay Anand ... David Rathod / Jo Jo Vaswani
 Avtar Gill ...  Malhotra's brother "Papaji"
 Girish Dhamija ...  M.R. Poplet
 Sanjeeva Vatsa  (as Sanjiva Vatsa)
 Savita Karle
 Ramesh Rai
 Gautam Saugat
 Krishna Bhatt
 Abbas Ali Moghul  (as Abbas Ali)
 Tanuja Chandra ...  Chachi Chunchi
 Sanjay Jha
 Khalid Siddiqui  (as Khalid)
 Dolly Powari
 Deepak Tijori ...  Dancer at Parsi party
 Shruti Ulfat ...  Dancer at Parsi party

Soundtrack

Trivia
The film was announced as Mr. Aashiq and the audio released under that name. When the film got delayed, its producers changed its title and released it as Yeh Hai Mumbai Meri Jaan.

This was another movie where Saif played a role originally played by Michael J. Fox. Earlier he had played Fox's role of the movie star from The Hard Way in his Main Khilari Tu Anari.

External links
 

1999 films
1990s Hindi-language films
Films set in Mumbai
Films scored by Jatin–Lalit
Films directed by Mahesh Bhatt